Pequod Mountain is a  summit in British Columbia, Canada.

Description

Precipitation runoff from the mountain drains north into headwaters of Butters Creek and south into Houston Creek which are both tributaries of the Duncan River. Pequod Mountain is more notable for its steep rise above local terrain than for its absolute elevation. The first ascent of the summit was made in 1958 by Douglas Anger, Bryan Mitchener and Daniel Neifert.

Etymology

The landform is named after the Pequod, which was the whaling ship of Herman Melville's novel Moby-Dick that was published in 1851. In turn, the ship was named for the Algonquian-speaking Pequot tribe of Native Americans. The name was submitted in 1960 by mountaineer Sam Silverstein of the Alpine Club of Canada and follows the Herman Melville-associated naming theme of the area established in 1958–59 by the Sam Silverstein-Douglas Anger climbing party. The mountain's toponym was officially adopted on November 1, 1963, by the Geographical Names Board of Canada.

Climate

Based on the Köppen climate classification, Pequod Mountain is located in a subarctic climate zone with cold, snowy winters, and mild summers. Winter temperatures can drop below −20 °C with wind chill factors below −30 °C. This climate supports the Pequod Glacier on the east slope of the peak, the Moby Dick Glacier on the south slope, and an unnamed glacier on the north slope.

See also
Geography of British Columbia

Gallery

References

External links
 Pequod Mountain: Weather forecast

Two-thousanders of British Columbia
Selkirk Mountains
Kootenay Land District
Moby-Dick